Thomas Elliott (22 March 1879 – 21 October 1939) was an Australian cricketer. He played three first-class matches for Tasmania between 1908 and 1914.

See also
 List of Tasmanian representative cricketers

References

External links
 

1879 births
1939 deaths
Australian cricketers
Tasmania cricketers
Cricketers from Hobart